Kamil Mingazov (born 21 June 1968) is a Turkmenistani football coach and former footballer. In Turkmenistan's opening match at the 1994 Asian Games versus China, Turkmenistan had only 11 players to choose from, as the other 9 members of their 20-man squad were delayed in Moscow due to visa problems. Mingazov (usually a midfielder) played as goalkeeper in a 2–2 draw.

Mingazov has also been the head coach of the Turkmenistan women's football team since 2016.

Personal life
Mingazow's son Ruslan is a Turkmenistani International footballer who currently plays for Kitchee.

References

1968 births
Living people
Soviet footballers
Turkmenistan footballers
Turkmenistan expatriate footballers
Turkmenistan international footballers
Footballers at the 1994 Asian Games
Asian Games competitors for Turkmenistan
2004 AFC Asian Cup players
FC Bukovyna Chernivtsi players
FK Köpetdag Aşgabat players
FC Nisa Aşgabat players
FC Shakhter Karagandy players
FC Nisa Aşgabat managers
Sportspeople from Ashgabat
Turkmenistan people of Tatar descent
Association football midfielders
FC Zhenis Astana players
Expatriate footballers in Kazakhstan
Turkmenistan expatriate sportspeople in Kazakhstan
Turkmenistan football managers
Tatar sportspeople
Outfield association footballers who played in goal
Women's national association football team managers